Carrizozo Municipal Airport  is a town owned, public use airport located one nautical mile (2 km) northwest of the central business district of Carrizozo, a town in Lincoln County, New Mexico, United States. It is included in the National Plan of Integrated Airport Systems for 2011–2015, which categorized it as a general aviation facility.

Facilities and aircraft 
Carrizozo Municipal Airport covers an area of 204 acres (83 ha) at an elevation of 5,371 feet (1,637 m) above mean sea level. It has two runways: 6/24 is 4,900 by 75 feet (1,494 x 23 m) with an asphalt surface; 15/33 is 2,500 by 90 feet (762 x 27 m) with a dirt surface.

For the 12-month period ending April 7, 2010, the airport had 3,112 aircraft operations, an average of 259 per month: 99.6% general aviation and 0.4% military. At that time there were 9 aircraft based at this airport, all single-engine.

References

External links 
 Aerial image as of October 1996 from USGS The National Map
 

Airports in New Mexico
Transportation in Lincoln County, New Mexico
Buildings and structures in Lincoln County, New Mexico